De bruut is a 1922 Dutch silent film directed by Theo Frenkel.

Cast
 Willem van der Veer - Charles Duval, de bruut
 Erna Morena - Charles Duvals vrouw
 Bruno Decarli - Henri Norwart
 Adolphe Engers - George Smith
 Coen Hissink - Duvals criminele vriend
 Marianne Stanior - Norwarts jonge zoon
 Marthe Ebinger - Norwarts zieke vrouw
 Gustav Fröhlich
 Theo Frenkel

External links 
 

Dutch silent feature films
1922 films
Dutch black-and-white films
Films directed by Theo Frenkel